Oakwood is a town in Dewey County, Oklahoma, United States. The population was 65 at the 2010 census.

Geography
Oakwood is located in eastern Dewey County at  (35.931363, -98.705884).

Demographics

As of the census of 2000, there were 72 people, 35 households, and 17 families residing in the town. There were 48 housing units at an average density of 203.9 per square mile (77.2/km2). The racial makeup of the town was 94.44% White, 1.39% Native American, 1.39% from other races, and 2.78% from two or more races. Hispanic or Latino of any race were 1.39% of the population.

There were 35 households, out of which 22.9% had children under the age of 18 living with them, 42.9% were married couples living together, 2.9% had a female householder with no husband present, and 48.6% were non-families. 42.9% of all households were made up of individuals, and 20.0% had someone living alone who was 65 years of age or older. The average household size was 2.06 and the average family size was 2.83.

In the town, the population was spread out, with 16.7% under the age of 18, 12.5% from 18 to 24, 19.4% from 25 to 44, 29.2% from 45 to 64, and 22.2% who were 65 years of age or older. The median age was 47 years. For every 100 females, there were 89.5 males. For every 100 females age 18 and over, there were 106.9 males.

The median income for a household in the town was $18,125, and the median income for a family was $36,875. Males had a median income of $16,250 versus $30,625 for females. The per capita income for the town was $21,254. There were 18.2% of families and 22.0% of the population living below the poverty line, including no under eighteens and 50.0% of those over 64.

References

Towns in Dewey County, Oklahoma
Towns in Oklahoma